Charles Raymond Henwood  (15 January 1937 – 26 August 2019) was a Welsh-born New Zealand actor. He was married to district court judge Carolyn Henwood, and was the father of New Zealand comedian Dai Henwood.

Born in Swansea, Wales, on 15 January 1937, Henwood emigrated to New Zealand at the age of 25, and became a naturalised New Zealander in 1977. In 1962, Henwood was appointed to the staff of Mana College in Porirua, teaching science and mathematics there for four years. He then joined the Department of Scientific and Industrial Research (DSIR) as a toxicologist and helped to introduce the breathalyser. In 1971, he published a book on drug use in New Zealand, A Turned On World, that was critical of the Narcotics Act (1965), describing the Act as "using a cannon to kill flies"..

Henwood was one of the founding members of Circa Theatre and kept contributing to Circa until his death. In the 2006 Queen's Birthday Honours, Henwood was appointed an Officer of the New Zealand Order of Merit, for services to film and the theatre.

Henwood died in Wellington on 26 August 2019, aged 82.

Selected filmography  
 Opening Night (1977, TV Movie) – Clem Smith
 The John Sullivan Story (1979, TV Movie) – Colonel Smythe
 Should I Be Good? (1985) – Peter Chartwell
 Hot Target (1985) – Douglas Maxwell
 The End of the Golden Weather (1991) – Reverend Thirle
 Heavenly Creatures (1994) – Professor
 The Lord of the Rings: The Fellowship of the Ring (2001) – Council Man (uncredited)
 Second Hand Wedding (2008) – Desmond Daney
 Separation City (2009) – Registrar
 The Hobbit: The Desolation of Smaug (2013) – Old Fisherman

References

External links 
 

1937 births
2019 deaths
Male actors from Swansea
Welsh male film actors
New Zealand male film actors
Officers of the New Zealand Order of Merit
Welsh emigrants to New Zealand
New Zealand male television actors
New Zealand male stage actors
20th-century Welsh male actors
21st-century Welsh male actors
20th-century New Zealand male actors
21st-century New Zealand male actors
People associated with Department of Scientific and Industrial Research (New Zealand)
Toxicologists
New Zealand schoolteachers